Chilanga is a municipality in the Morazán department of El Salvador.

External links
 Legislative Information (in Spanish)
Chilanga Decree (in Spanish)
Where is Chilanga in Morazan, El Salvador Located? (Gomapper)

Municipalities of the Morazán Department